is an entertainment company.

History
In February 1968, Hiroshi Kawai left Bandai to establish his own toy business. Kawai founded  on June 7, 1969.

In November 1994, Bandai acquired shares of Happinet. Happinet first appeared on the Tokyo Stock Exchange in December 1998.

Happinet acquired Beam Entertainment and its adult label, Green Bunny, in December 1999. It renamed the division  in July 2002.

Products

Happinet had an exclusive anime licensing agreement with NuTech Digital in 2003.
In addition to producing and distributing anime and films, Happinet acquires the rights to foreign films for Japanese distribution.

TV Anime
Full Metal Panic? Fumoffu
Xenosaga: The Animation
Full Metal Panic! The Second Raid
Gin'iro no Olynssis
The Familiar of Zero
Ancient Ruler Dinosaur King DKidz Adventure
Rocket Girls
Romeo × Juliet
Rosario + Vampire
Ancient Ruler Dinosaur King DKidz Adventure: Pterosaur Legend
Rosario + Vampire capu2
B Gata H Kei
Manyū Hiken-chō
Daily Lives of High School Boys
Shomin Sample
Regalia: The Three Sacred Stars
Flip Flappers
Grimoire of Zero
Angel's 3Piece!
Citrus
Chrono Crusade
Kakuriyo: Bed and Breakfast for Spirits
Between the Sky and Sea
Iroduku: The World in Colors
Operation Han-Gyaku-Sei Million Arthur
The Price of Smiles
Rage of Bahamut: Manaria Friends
Anime films
The Girl Who Leapt Through Time
OVAs
Kite: International Version
Mezzo Forte: International Version
Live Action films
Hula Girls
Helter Skelter
The Complex
My Man
Himeanole
Video Games
Brigandine: The Legend of Runersia
Teenage Mutant Ninja Turtles: Shredder's Revenge (Japanese localization)

References

External links
Official website (Japanese)
Happinet Pictures website (Japanese)
Happinet Games website (Japanese)
Official website (English)

Anime companies
Entertainment companies of Japan
Entertainment companies established in 1969
Mass media companies established in 1969
Japanese companies established in 1969
Bandai Namco Holdings subsidiaries